FC Gornyak Kachkanar ( translated as "mining worker")) was a Russian football team from Kachkanar . It played professionally from 1992 to 1997. Their best result was 6th place in Zone 5 of the Russian Second Division in 1992. Viktor Shlyayev who was Russian professional football coach led the team between 1992 and 1996.

Team name history
 1992–1994: FC Gornyak Kachkanar
 1995: FC Gornyak-Vanadiy Kachkanar
 1996–1997: FC Gornyak Kachkanar

External links
  Team history at KLISF

Association football clubs established in 1992
Association football clubs disestablished in 2001
Defunct football clubs in Russia
Sport in Sverdlovsk Oblast
1992 establishments in Russia
2001 disestablishments in Russia